Ulrich Schamoni (9 November 1939 – 9 March 1998) was a German film director, screenwriter, actor and media proprietor.

Biography
Schamoni began his career as an assistant director, among others for William Dieterle. He was a signatory of the Oberhausen Manifesto in 1962. His first feature film, Es, won five Deutsche Filmpreise. His 1967 film Alle Jahre wieder won the Silver Bear Extraordinary Jury Prize at the 17th Berlin International Film Festival.

He was the brother of Peter Schamoni, also a film director and producer.

Ulrich Schamoni died on the March 9, 1998 in Berlin as a result of a cancer illness and was buried at the Waldfriedhof Zehlendorf in that city's Zehlendorf district.

Selected filmography
 1966: Es
 1967: Next Year, Same Time 
 1968: 
 1970: 
 1971: Eins
 1973: 
 1979: 
 1985:  (as actor)

References

External links

1939 births
1998 deaths
Film people from Berlin
German male film actors
German male television actors
20th-century German male actors
Best Director German Film Award winners
Burials at the Waldfriedhof Zehlendorf